P. globulus may refer to:
 Pustularia globulus, a cowry, a sea snail species occurring in the Red Sea and Indian Ocean
 Podocarpus globulus, a conifer species found in Indonesia and Malaysia

See also 
 Globulus (disambiguation)